Camouflage Daguet is the French military's current desert camouflage. It is the desert variant of Camouflage Central-Europe.

History
Although it was introduced in 1989, this French desert camouflage model is commonly known as "Daguet" because it is closely associated with Operation Daguet, where French conventional forces used it for the first time.

Prior to the adoption, the French military never considered another camouflage uniform again because of their association with their colonial conflicts.

Pattern

Introduced in 1988, consisting of broad horizontal tan and brown stripes on a sandy background. The Daguet pattern has been issued in separate uniforms for French troops deployed in countries/territories with desert terrain.

Users

 : Daguet clones used by CAR military units.
 : Adopted by the French military in 1989.
 : Used by Ukrainian Forces and Kastuś Kalinoŭski Regiment. 
 : UAE troops wore Daguet clones in desert-based operations.

References

Bibliography
 
 
 

Camouflage patterns
Military equipment introduced in the 1980s